is the fourth single by Japanese singer Yōko Oginome. Written by Fumiko Okada and Ryuichi Sakamoto, the single was released on February 21, 1985, by Victor Entertainment.

Background and release
A continuation of the "Sayonara kara Hajimaru Monogatari" video, the music video features Oginome performing the song in different environments such as a cabin by the snow, a dance studio, and a redressed version of the stage previously used in the "Mirai Kōkai (Sailing)" video.

"Mukokuseki Romance" peaked at No. 35 on Oricon's singles chart and sold over 27,000 copies.

Track listing

Charts

References

External links

1985 singles
Yōko Oginome songs
Japanese-language songs
Victor Entertainment singles